The 38th Field Regiment was an artillery regiment of the New Zealand Military Forces raised during the Second World War. The Regiment was formed on 12 April 1943 at Papakura Military Camp and consisted of 49, 50 and 52 batteries. The regiment departed New Zealand in eight different ships between May and July and cotinued training in New Caledonia. From late October till November 1943 the regiment took part in the Battle of the Treasury Islands as part of the 8th Brigade Group. From April 1944, 38th Field Regiment began to have men transferred to other units or returned home to work in essential industries due to a manpower shortage. The regiment  had been reduced to 48 men by August and the entire 3rd Division was formally disbanded in October 1944.

References

Artillery regiments of New Zealand
Military units and formations established in 1942
Military units and formations disestablished in 1944